The Saltire Society Literary Awards are made annually by the Saltire Society. The awards seek to recognise books which are either by "living authors of Scottish descent or residing in Scotland," or which deal with "the work or life of a Scot or with a Scottish question, event or situation." The awards have been described as "the premiere prize for writing by Scots or about Scotland."

The first Saltire Society Book Award was given in 1937, the year after the Saltire Society was established. No awards were given after 1939 due to the Second World War, and the next award was made 1956. The History Book of the Year award was inaugurated in 1965. In 1982 sponsorship was obtained and since then the awards have been made annually. First books have been recognised since 1988, and in 1998 the award for Scottish Research Book of the Year was established. The Saltire Society currently presents awards in the seven following categories:

 Scottish Book of the Year
 Scottish First Book of the Year
 Scottish History Book of the Year
 Scottish Research Book of the Year
 Scottish Poetry Book of the Year (introduced in 2014)
 Scottish Fiction Book of the Year (introduced in 2015)
 Scottish Non-Fiction Book of the Year (introduced in 2015)

In 2014, the Scottish Literary Book of the Year was awarded, but did not return in subsequent years.

In 2019, a Lifetime Achievement Award was introduced, the inaugural prize going to Alasdair Gray.

In addition, an annual student travel bursary is awarded to a creative writing graduate, and the Ross Roy Medal is awarded for the best PhD thesis on a subject related to Scottish literature. A one-off Homecoming Book of the Year award was made in 2009 to celebrate the "Year of homecoming": the award was presented to American professor Donald Worster for his biography of John Muir, A Passion for Nature.

Past winners

Scottish Book of the Year

The Scottish Book of the Year award was established in 1937, and has been given annually since 1982. The award is open to novels, poetry and plays as well as non-fiction works on Scottish subjects.

Scottish Fiction of the Year 
The fiction book of the year award was inaugurated in 2015.

Scottish First Book of the Year
The first book of the year award was inaugurated in 1988 and recognises an author who has not previously published a book. As with the book of the year, the award is open to novels, plays, poems and non-fiction.

Scottish History Book of the Year

The award for History Book of the Year was established in 1965 in honour of the historian Agnes Mure Mackenzie (1891–1955).

Scottish Research Book of the Year
This award was initiated in 1998, and is made jointly by the Saltire Society and the National Library of Scotland. It aims to recognise books which "represent a significant body of research and offer new insight or dimension to the subject".

See also 
 Scottish literature
 Scottish Mortgage Investment Trust Book Awards, formerly the Scottish Arts Council Book Awards
 List of history awards
 List of literary awards
 List of awards named after people

References

Strachan, Anne (1989) Prizewinning Literature: UK Literary Award Winners Library Association Publishing Ltd.

Further reading
 

Scottish literary awards
First book awards
History awards
Awards established in 1982
1982 establishments in Scotland
Annual events in Scotland
Scottish awards